This article lists notable manufacturers of sporting goods.

Brands

References

Sporting goods manufacturers
Sporting Goods*
Sporting goods manufacturers